Lasiacantha capucina is a species of true bug belonging to the family Tingidae.

It is native to Europe.

References

Tingidae